Eduard Nikolayevich Artemyev (30 November 1937 – 29 December 2022) was a Soviet and Russian composer of electronic music and film scores. Outside of Russia, he is mostly known for his soundtracks for films such as At Home Among Strangers, Solaris, Siberiade, Stalker, and Burnt by the Sun. He was awarded the title People's Artist of Russia in 1999.

Biography
Artemyev was born in Novosibirsk and studied at the Moscow Conservatory under Yuri Shaporin. His interest in electronic music and synthesizers began after his graduation in 1960, when electronic music was still in its infancy. He wrote his first composition in 1967, on one of the first synthesizers, the ANS synthesizer, which was developed by Soviet engineer, Yevgeny Murzin. He was thus one of the first composers and a pioneer of electronic music. His collaboration with the film director Andrei Tarkovsky in the 1970s made him well-known. He wrote the film scores of Tarkovsky's Solaris, Mirror and Stalker. Later, he also wrote film scores for Andrei Konchalovsky and Nikita Mikhalkov. His film scores and his music received numerous accolades as well as three Nika Awards. He licensed several excerpts from the Solaris soundtrack in order to use them in the Spanish production The Cosmonaut. Eduard Artemyev wrote a couple of songs the most famous of them Deltaplan by Valery Leontiev.

In 2001, he won the Special Silver St. George at the 23rd Moscow International Film Festival.

Artemyevs composition Campaign or Death of the hero (Siberiade theme) was used at the 2014 Winter Olympics opening ceremony in Sochi, and his music theme from At Home Among Strangers was used at the closing ceremony.

Artemyev died in 29 December 2022, at the age of 85.

Film scores (selected)
Solaris (Солярис, 1972)
A Very English Murder (Чисто английское убийство, 1974)
At Home Among Strangers (Свой среди чужих, чужой среди своих, 1974)
Mirror (Зеркало, 1975)
A Slave of Love (Раба любви, 1976)
An Unfinished Piece for Mechanical Piano (Неоконченная пьеса для механического пианино, 1977)
Territory (Территория, 1978)
Stalker (Сталкер, 1979)
Siberiade (Сибириада, 1979)
The Bodyguard (Телохранитель, 1979)
A Few Days from the Life of I. I. Oblomov (Несколько дней из жизни И. И. Обломова, 1980)
Anna: 6 - 18 (Анна: от 6 до 18, 1980—1993)
Fox Hunting (Охота на лис, 1980)
The Fairfax Millions (Миллионы Ферфакса, 1980)
Family Relations (Родня, 1981)
The Train Has Stopped (Остановился поезд, 1982)
Without Witness (Без свидетелей, 1983)
Moon Rainbow (Лунная радуга, 1983)
Return from Orbit (Возвращение с орбиты, 1983)
TASS Is Authorized to Declare... (ТАСС уполномочен заявить..., 1984)
The Invisible Man (Человек-невидимка, 1984)
One Second for a Feat (Секунда на подвиг, 1985)
Courier (Курьер, 1986)
Visit to Minotaur (Визит к Минотавру, 1987)
Zerograd (Город Зеро, 1989)
Close to Eden (Урга - территория любви, 1991)
Genius (Гений, 1991)
Burnt by the Sun (Утомлённые солнцем, 1994)
The Odyssey (Одиссей, 1997)
War is Over. Please Forget... (Война окончена. Забудьте..., 1997)
The Barber of Siberia (Сибирский цирюльник, 1998)
As Far as My Feet Will Carry Me (Побег из Гулага, 2001)
House of Fools (Дом дураков, 2002)
A Driver for Vera (Водитель для Веры, 2004)
12 (2007)
Gloss (Глянец, 2007)
The Nutcracker in 3D (Щелкунчик и Крысиный Король, 2009)
Home (Дом, 2011)
Branded (Москва 2017, 2011)
Legend No. 17 (Легенда №17, 2013)
The Postman's White Nights (Белые ночи почтальона Алексея Тряпицына, 2014)
Sunstroke (Солнечный удар, 2014)
The Heritage of Love (Герой, 2016)

Covers
PPK - ResuRection (2001) | Cover of Theme to Siberiade
Qilgad - Siberiade (2020) | Cover of Theme to Siberiade
DJ Feel - Not Alone (Three friends) (2021) | Cover of Theme to At Home Among Strangers
Grazhdanskaya Oborona - Starfall (2002) | Cover of Theme to At Home Among Strangers
Papulin & TonyLove - SLAVE OF LOVE/ADMIRERS (2016) | Cover of Theme to SLAVE OF LOVE/ADMIRERS
On Thorns I Lay - "Black Cold Nights", from the album "Angeldust" (2001) | The chorus-verse is also a cover of the Theme to Siberiade
Digital Mastermind - The Space Theme | Cover of Theme to Siberiade
VIZE and Alan Walker featuring Leony - Space Melody (Edward Artemyev) | Cover of Theme to Siberiade with added lyrics

Other recordings
Warmth of Earth (2001)
Three Odes (2002)

References

External links

 
 Eduard Artemyev at electroshock.ru

1937 births
2022 deaths
Burials at Vagankovo Cemetery
20th-century composers
20th-century Russian male musicians
Musicians from Novosibirsk
Academicians of the National Academy of Motion Picture Arts and Sciences of Russia
Moscow Conservatory alumni
Academic staff of Moscow Conservatory
People's Artists of Russia
Electronic musicians
Recipients of the Nika Award
Recipients of the Order "For Merit to the Fatherland", 4th class
Recipients of the Vasilyev Brothers State Prize of the RSFSR
State Prize of the Russian Federation laureates
Male film score composers
Russian composers
Russian electronic musicians
Russian film score composers
Russian keyboardists
Russian male composers
Russian National Music Award winners
Soviet composers
Soviet film score composers
Soviet male composers